is a former professional boxer from Japan. He is the former WBC and lineal flyweight champion, and former Japanese and OPBF flyweight champion.

Professional career 
Naito made his professional debut in October, 1996. He compiled an undefeated record, and challenged future WBA flyweight champion Takefumi Sakata for the Japanese flyweight title on July 16, 2001, but failed to win the title in a 10-round draw.

Naito traveled to Thailand in 2002 for his first world title shot, challenging Pongsaklek Wonjongkam for the WBC and lineal flyweight titles. Naito was knocked out only 34 seconds into the first round, setting the record for the fastest knockout in a world flyweight title match ever.

On June 6, 2004, Naito dominated his opponent to win the Japanese flyweight title. He made his first defense later that year, knocking out the challenger only 24 seconds into the first round to set the record for the shortest Japanese flyweight title match ever. He made two defenses before returning his title.

Naito challenged Wonjongkam for the second time on October 10, 2005, but lost by decision after the fight was stopped due to an injury in the 7th round. Naito won the Japanese flyweight title for the second time in February, 2006, and won the OPBF flyweight title in June, 2006, by 6th-round TKO.

Naito made one defense of the OPBF title before returning it in February, 2007. He also announced his decision to challenge Pongsaklek Wonjongkam for the third time, but found it difficult to gather sponsors. The match was finalized on July 6; only 12 days prior to the actual match-up. Naito defeated Pongsaklek Wonjongkam on July 18, 2007 by 12-round unanimous decision, winning the WBC and lineal flyweight titles five years after his first world title shot. Wonjongkam had made 17 defenses of the world title, and had not lost in over a decade.

On October 11, 2007, Naito defeated Daiki Kameda by unanimous decision for the first defense of his WBC and lineal titles. Naito thoroughly outclassed the younger fighter (Kameda is 15 years his junior) despite being fouled throughout the fight. He received illegal blows to the thighs on several occasions, and was thrown down onto the ring in a wrestling-like maneuver in the 12th round. Koki Kameda's upcoming fight was cancelled after video footage was produced showing that he encouraged his younger brother to foul Naito in-between rounds, and Daiki Kameda's boxing license was suspended for one year. The fight received widespread coverage by the Japanese media because of the heated exchanges between Naito and the Kameda boxing family. Daiki Kameda had described Naito as a "cockroach" prior to the fight, and stated that he would commit harakiri (ritual suicide) if he were to lose. The victory gave Naito celebrity status in Japan, and he has appeared in numerous Japanese television programs and commercials since then.

Naito fought Pongsaklek Wonjongkam for the 4th time on March 3, 2008 for his 2nd title defense. Naito retained his titles as the bout ended in a draw, with one judge scoring the bout even, another scoring it in favor of Naito, and the other in favor of Wonjongkam. His 3rd defense came against Japanese flyweight champion Tomonobu Shimizu on July 30, 2008 at the Yoyogi National Gymnasium in Tokyo. The open scoring system was used for this bout, and the score announcement after the 8th round revealed Shimizu to be leading on points. However, Naito landed a left hook and a combination to score a knockdown in the 10th round, and won the fight by knockout in the same round with another combination. This bout was on the same card as WBA flyweight champion Takefumi Sakata's 4th title defense, and Koki Kameda made a surprise appearance on the ring to congratulate Naito during the post-fight interview.

On December 23, 2008, Naito won in his 4th title defense by stopping Shingo Yamaguchi in the 11th round.

For his 5th defense, Naito faced Xiong Zhao Zhong of China on May 26, 2009. Despite taking on a rather small opponent (4'11), Naito was sent to the canvas in the 6th round. But in the end, he still escaped with a unanimous decision.

On November 29, 2009, he lost the WBC lineal flyweight titles to Koki Kameda in Saitama, Japan, losing by unanimous decision.

Naito retired from boxing in November 2011. Since his retirement, he works as a boxing commentator and a tarento.

Professional boxing record

See also 
List of flyweight boxing champions
List of WBC world champions
List of Japanese boxing world champions
Boxing in Japan

References

External links 

 
 Daisuke Naito - CBZ Profile

|-

|-

1974 births
Flyweight boxers
Living people
World Boxing Council champions
World flyweight boxing champions
Boxing commentators
World boxing champions
Sportspeople from Hokkaido
Japanese male boxers